Who Shall Take My Life? is a 1917 American silent drama film directed by Colin Campbell and starring Tom Santschi, Fritzi Brunette, and Edward Coxen.

Cast
 Tom Santschi as Big Bill O'Shaughnessy 
 Fritzi Brunette as Kate Taylor 
 Edward Coxen as Fran Coswell 
 Bessie Eyton as Mary Moran 
 Harry Lonsdale as Honorable James Munroe 
 Eugenie Besserer as Mrs. Munroe 
 Al W. Filson as The governor 
 Virginia Kirtley as Mag Scott

References

Bibliography
 Donald W. McCaffrey & Christopher P. Jacobs. Guide to the Silent Years of American Cinema. Greenwood Publishing, 1999.

External links
 

1917 films
1917 drama films
1910s English-language films
American silent feature films
Silent American drama films
American black-and-white films
Films directed by Colin Campbell
1910s American films